Phragmataecia psyche is a species of moth of the family Cossidae. It is found in Benin, Niger and Senegal.

References

Moths described in 1919
Phragmataecia
Moths of Africa